The 1970 RAC British Saloon Car Championship, was the 13th season of the series. This year saw the introduction of the new Group 2 regulations. Bill McGovern won his first title, driving a Sunbeam Imp.

Calendar & Winners
All races were held in the United Kingdom. Overall winners in bold.

Championship results

Note: Sources vary in listing McGovern’s car as a Hillman Imp 
or as a Sunbeam Imp.

References

British Touring Car Championship seasons
Saloon Car